Matthew Erickson Moore (born August 9, 1984) is a former American football quarterback. He was signed by the Dallas Cowboys as an undrafted free agent in 2007, and has also played for the Carolina Panthers, the Kansas City Chiefs, and the Miami Dolphins. He played college football at UCLA and Oregon State.

Early years
After playing youth football for six years with Palmdale Falcons Youth Football, Moore attended William S. Hart High School in Santa Clarita, California.

As a junior, Moore lettered in football while playing as a safety, earning All-CIF acclaim with 80 tackles and 10 interceptions on the season.

Moore lettered again during his senior year playing as Hart High School's starting quarterback. Moore led his team to a 13–0 record, culminating in a 42–13 win over Valencia in the CIF-Southern Section Division III title game. In the sectional, division title game, Moore completed 14 of 18 passes for 277 yards and four touchdowns and ran 15 times for 95 yards and one score. On the year, he completed 234 of 353 (66.3%) passes for 3,334 yards and 33 touchdowns and ran for 415 yards and seven scores. Moore was named the CIF-SS Division III Offensive Player of the Year. He was named First-team All-State and First-team All-CIF SS. He was selected to play in the 2002 North-South Shrine All-Star game.

Moore ended his senior season as one of the top-rated quarterbacks in the nation. He was ranked No. 8 by Scout.com and No. 11 by Rivals.com. SuperPrep rated him as the No. 8 quarterback in the nation and named him the FarWest Offensive Player of the Year. Max Emfinger named him to his All-America team and ranked him as a four-star prospect and the No. 17 quarterback prospect. PacWest Football rated Moore a four-star rating and rated him the No. 6 quarterback in the West and No. 9 in the nation. PrepStar named Moore to the All-American team and rated him the No. 5 quarterback in the West. He was named member of the Tacoma News Tribune Western 100, the Las Vegas Sun Super 11 second-team, the Los Angeles Times All-Star Team, and the First-team L.A. Times All-San Fernando Valley, which selected him as the region Player of the Year.

Moore lettered twice in baseball playing shortstop and third base.

College career

2002
Moore began his college football career at UCLA. He was slated to redshirt, but was pressed into duty due to injuries to Cory Paus and Drew Olson against Cal. He appeared in six games as a true freshman, becoming the first Bruins' true-freshman quarterback to start since Cade McNown. The Bruins defeated Stanford in Moore's debut, making him the first true-freshman QB in his first game to lead UCLA to victory. He led the team to seven scoring drives against the Cardinals. He saw action against Arizona, USC, Washington State, and New Mexico in the Las Vegas Bowl as a reserve. Moore was 7 for 11 for 64 yards and one touchdown in the annual rivalry game against USC. For the season he completed 33 of 62 passes for 412 yards, two touchdowns and no interceptions.

2003
Moore started four of the eight games he appeared in at UCLA. He threw for 555 yards, two touchdowns, and six interceptions as a sophomore, completing 52 of 103 passes. He started the season opener against Colorado, but suffered a leg injury that sidelined him for the next three games. He had difficulty regaining the starting job with just eight pass attempts over the next three games. He moved back in front of Olson on the depth chart for the Oct 26 game at the Rose Bowl against Arizona State, passing for 190 yards and a touchdown in UCLA's 20–13 win. He also started the team's next two games against Stanford and Washington State.
At the end of the season, Moore transferred from UCLA. (LA Times, December 5, 2003).

2004
Moore did not play in 2004 while attending the College of the Canyons in Santa Clarita, California. Although he had not played baseball since high school, he was selected in the 22nd round of the 2004 MLB draft by the Los Angeles Angels after scouts saw him play in a Southern California semi-pro baseball league and invited him to private workouts with the team.

2005
Although he also strongly considered Colorado State, Moore enrolled at Oregon State in January 2005 and participated in spring training with the team. Head coach Mike Riley announced him as the leader on the depth chart entering the 2005 season. He finished the season with 2,711 yards passing, the ninth-highest total for a single season at OSU. His .594 completion percentage was third among the 20-best single season yardage performances in school history. Moore injured his right knee in the second quarter of the 10th game of the season against Stanford and missed the remainder of the year. His 271.1 yards passing per game was second in the Pac-10, trailing only USC's Matt Leinart (293.5). Making yet another record-breaking debut, he threw for 367 yards in the season opener against Portland State, the most ever by a Beaver quarterback in his first start. Moore threw for a career-high 436 yards against Arizona, had 317 yards at Louisville, and 311 against Arizona State. He hit Mike Hass on a 63-yard touchdown strike against Washington State that gave OSU the lead 37–33 after the team trailed 30–13 late in the second quarter. He also had two 58-yard passes—one to Anthony Wheat-Brown in the team's upset of No. 18 California in Berkeley and the other one week later (again to Hass) in his return to the Rose Bowl.

2006
Moore started all 14 games for the Beavers and was an All-Pac-10 honorable mention leading the Beavers to a 10-win season capped off by a Sun Bowl victory against Mizzou. After a 2–3 start, Moore and coach Mike Riley received a great deal of criticism from fans. Both found redemption after winning the next 8 of 9 games. This streak included a win over #3 ranked USC and a Civil War win at home. On the season, Moore completed 229 of 378 passes for 3,022 yards and 18 touchdowns with seven interceptions. He set an Oregon State record for the most consecutive pass attempts without an interception with 183 before having that streak end in the Sun Bowl.  He was named MVP of the Sun Bowl after throwing for 356 yards and four touchdowns and rushing for one touchdown. The 4 passing TDs were a Sun Bowl record. It was the second-highest scoring game in the Sun Bowl's 73-year history. He was 5-for-7 for 55 yards on the winning drive, setting up a 2-point conversion to put the Beavers up 39–38 with 22 seconds left to play.

Professional career

Dallas Cowboys
Moore was not selected in the 2007 NFL Draft, but he was courted by the Dallas Cowboys and the Carolina Panthers, among other teams. Eventually, Moore signed as an undrafted free agent with the Dallas Cowboys. On signing with Dallas, Moore stated, "They had two quarterbacks on the roster; it was the Cowboys," adding "seemed like an easy choice to me at the time."

During the preseason, Moore completed 21 of 29 pass attempts for 182 yards, one touchdown, and no interceptions, while also logging a 100.1 quarterback rating. On September 1, the Cowboys waived Moore during their final preseason cuts. The Cowboys intended to sign Moore to their practice squad had he passed through waivers. However, the following day, he was claimed off waivers by the Carolina Panthers.

Carolina Panthers

2007 season
After being signed by the Panthers, Moore was listed as the third-string quarterback behind veterans Jake Delhomme and David Carr. Delhomme suffered a strained right elbow injury, early in the season, during a game against the Atlanta Falcons. Moore saw his first regular season action on October 7, 2007, against the New Orleans Saints, during the Panthers' 5th game of the season. Near the end of the first quarter, Moore entered the game after Carr suffered a back injury, due to a sack. Moore's first NFL completion was a 43-yard pass to Keary Colbert; his playing time was brief as Carr returned to the field for the game's second half. The following day, Delhomme determined it would be best to undergo season-ending ligament-replacement surgery for his elbow injury. As a result of Delhomme's season-ending surgery and Carr's back injury, the Panthers signed veteran quarterback Vinny Testaverde to their roster.

Moore later briefly relieved Carr towards the end of a week 9 game against the Tennessee Titans. Moore also entered the Panthers' week 12 loss to the Saints, after Carr's ineffective performance. A balky back kept Testaverde from starting this game, and the Panthers' head coach John Fox stated that if healthy enough, Testaverde would start the next game over both Carr and Moore.

After six brief appearances during the season, Moore started his first NFL game on December 16, 2007, against the Seattle Seahawks; Testaverde was ruled unable to play, because of "general soreness." He led the Panthers to victory against the Seahawks while completing 19 of 27 passes for 208 yards without a turnover. The following week, the Panthers suffered a loss against the Cowboys, while Moore had 15 completions on 28 pass attempts for 182 yards, a touchdown, and an interception. During the game, Steve Smith hauled in Moore's first NFL touchdown pass. The Panthers ended the season with a road win against the Tampa Bay Buccaneers, in which Moore completed 15 of 24 pass attempts for 174 yards, two touchdowns, and an interception. After these performances, Moore was named the NFL Offensive Rookie of the Month for December. Overall, in the 2007 season, Moore finished with 730 passing yards, three touchdowns, and five interceptions.

2008 season
Moore played in all four 2008 preseason games for the Panthers; during the final preseason game against the Pittsburgh Steelers, Moore injured his leg. Moore was cleared to practice as two x-rays and an MRI revealed no broken bones. However, during a practice, Moore injured his leg, and an x-ray revealed a broken fibula. The Panthers' general manager Marty Hurney initially stated Moore would not be placed on injured reserve. Despite this, Moore was sidelined the entire 2008 season, and even spent the last 12 weeks of the season listed as inactive.

2009 season

Moore saw his first action of the 2009 season when backup quarterback Josh McCown was injured during the Panthers' week 1 loss to the Philadelphia Eagles. Moore finished with 63 yards, one touchdown, and one interception. Moore also played briefly against the Arizona Cardinals, attempting one pass which was incomplete.

After starter Jake Delhomme broke his finger in a week 12 loss to the New York Jets, Moore started against Tampa Bay on December 6, 2009, the following week. He completed 14 of 20 passes for 161 yards and an interception, en route to a 16–6 Panthers' victory. The following week, he completed 15 of 30 passes for 197 yards and a touchdown in a 20–10 loss to the New England Patriots.

On December 20 (in his 6th start) Moore had the best game of his career when he led the Panthers to a 26–7 upset victory over the Minnesota Vikings. In the victory he completed 21 of 33 passes for 299 yards, 3 touchdowns, and 0 interceptions, and improved to a career 4–2 as a starter. He drew praise from head coach John Fox and top receiver Steve Smith, who caught nine passes from Moore for 157 yards and a score.

On December 27 Moore completed 15 passes on 20 attempts for 171 yards, and for the second week in a row, three touchdowns and no interceptions, as Carolina beat the New York Giants 41–9. Moore had a career-high 139.8 passer rating. The victory came during the final game to be played in Giants Stadium and essentially eliminated the Giants from the playoffs. The Giants' home loss was their worst since 1998. Moore again drew praise from analysts, including Tony Dungy who said that Moore "looked liked a pro-bowler".

Moore started the last game of the Panthers' season on January 3, 2010, as the Panthers beat the New Orleans Saints 23–10. The Saints, who were the No. 1 seed in the NFC, were handed their third loss of the season as they rested most of their starters. The game was the coldest home game in team history for the Panthers. Moore completed 14 passes on 23 attempts for 162 yards and a touchdown. The win improved the Panthers to .500 with an 8–8 record (4–1 while starting Moore) to finish the season.

In his five games as a starter for the 2009 season, Moore threw eight touchdown passes with one interception. The strong finish by Moore and the Panthers, combined with earlier poor play by Jake Delhomme, led to speculation that Moore would challenge, if not replace, Jake Delhomme's role as the starting quarterback for the 2010 season despite Delhomme's large contract. This turned out be the case as Delhomme was cut from the Panthers on March 4, 2010.

2010 season
Moore was declared the starter for the 2010 season after Delhomme's release. Despite this, the Carolina Panthers drafted rookie Jimmy Clausen with their second round pick (48th overall) of the 2010 NFL Draft. Though Moore had clearly established himself as the Panthers' number one quarterback, he faced pressure for the starting job from Clausen, possibly resulting in his poor play throughout the rest of the season. Moore suffered a concussion during the season opener at the New York Giants, and he was benched the following week in a loss against the Tampa Bay Buccaneers following poor play. On September 20, 2010, Moore was removed as the Panthers' starting quarterback in favor of rookie Jimmy Clausen, after throwing four interceptions in the first two games.

After sitting out for three straight games, Moore was again declared the Panthers' starting quarterback on October 18, 2010, following poor play by Clausen. In his first game back as a starter against the San Francisco 49ers, Moore completed 28 passes on 41 attempts for 308 yards, two touchdowns and one interception, setting career highs in yards and completions.

In a week 9 loss to the New Orleans Saints, Moore injured his shoulder after a hit from Sedrick Ellis. He was placed on injured reserve by the Panthers, ending his season.

Miami Dolphins

2011 season

Moore was signed by the Dolphins on July 28, 2011, to back up Chad Henne. He switched numbers, from 3 to 8. On October 2, 2011, Moore entered the game against the Chargers in the first quarter after Henne went down with a shoulder injury. He completed 17 of 26 passes for 167 yards and an interception, compiling a 67.3 quarterback rating. On November 6 he became the first Miami quarterback since Chad Pennington in 2008 to throw three touchdown passes in a game, in their 31–3 win over the Kansas City Chiefs.He was named AFC Offensive Player of the Week for his game against the Chiefs.  He repeated that feat in week 11, blowing out the Bills 35–8, and had the highest QB rating of the week. Following the season, he was announced as the Dolphins' 2011 season MVP. Overall, Moore finished the 2011 season with 2,497 yards, 16 touchdowns, and nine interceptions.

2012 season
During the offseason, Moore was battling for the starting quarterback role against newly drafted Ryan Tannehill and newly signed David Garrard. Moore became the second-string quarterback. On November 28, 2012, in a week 8 game against the New York Jets, Moore went in for Tannehill after he left the game with injuries to his left knee and thigh. Moore went 11 for 19 on his passes with a touchdown, leading to a 30–9 victory over the Jets.

2013 season
On March 8, 2013, Moore re-signed with the Dolphins, agreeing on a two-year deal to remain a backup for Tannehill. He did not see much action in the 2013 season. His lone appearance came against the Buffalo Bills, where he was 2-of-6 for 53 yards and two interceptions in a 19–0 loss.

2014 season
In the 2014 season, Moore saw action in two games. On September 28, against the Oakland Raiders, he came into the end of the 38–14 victory in relief of Ryan Tannehill. On November 2, he was 2-of-4 for 21 yards in the 37–0 victory over the San Diego Chargers.

2015 season
In the 2015 season, he only appeared in one game. In the 44–26 victory over the Houston Texans, he completed one pass for 14 yards and ran out the clock at the end of the game in relief of Tannehill.

2016 season
On March 15, 2016, Moore re-signed with the Dolphins, agreeing on a two-year deal worth $3.5 million to remain a backup for Tannehill.
On December 11, 2016, during a week 14 game against the Arizona Cardinals, Moore saw his first action as quarterback for the season. He replaced Tannehill in the fourth quarter, after Tannehill was injured on a low hit by Cardinals' defensive end Calais Campbell. The injury would later be confirmed as a sprained left MCL and ACL. Moore led a game-winning field goal drive, highlighted by Moore's 29-yard pass to wide receiver Kenny Stills deep in the final quarter to put the Dolphins on the 3-yard line. After a couple of plays, Dolphins' kicker Andrew Franks kicked a 21-yard field goal in heavy rain to win the game 26–23, keeping the Dolphins' playoff hopes alive. He started the next game against the New York Jets, completing 12 of 18 passes for 236 yards and a career-high four touchdowns with one interception as the Dolphins beats the Jets by a score of 34–13, improving their record to 9–5 and clinching their first winning season since 2008. It was Moore's first start since 2011. With his performance, Moore was named AFC Offensive Player of the Week.

Moore was announced the starting quarterback for the Dolphins against the Pittsburgh Steelers in the Wild Card Round of the 2017 National Football League playoffs as Tannehill did not appear to be fully recovered. This was Moore's first playoff game. The Dolphins lost 30–12 to the Steelers in Pittsburgh.

2017 season
During week 7 against the New York Jets, Moore entered the game after Jay Cutler suffered a chest injury in the third quarter. Moore finished with 188 passing yards, two touchdowns, and an interception as the Dolphins won by a score of 31–28. Due to Cutler's injury, Moore started the week 8 game against the Baltimore Ravens, throwing for 176 yards and 2 interceptions as the Dolphins lost by a score of 40–0. Both of his interceptions were returned for touchdowns. During the week 11 game against the Tampa Bay Buccaneers, Cutler took a hit to the head on the final play of the first half and was relieved by Moore, who threw for 282 yards and 1 touchdown as the Dolphins lost by a score of 30–20. Due to Cutler being in the concussion protocol, Moore started the team's next game and finished with 215 passing yards, one touchdown, and two interceptions in the 35–17 loss.

Kansas City Chiefs

2019 season
Moore spent the 2018 season out of football, though he did receive offers to play. In 2019, he worked as a scout for the Miami Dolphins during the draft process. He had started working as an assistant coach for a high school football team when he signed with the Kansas City Chiefs on August 26, 2019, following an injury to backup quarterback Chad Henne.

Moore took over as the Chiefs' quarterback after Patrick Mahomes injured his knee on October 17, 2019, in a week 7 game on Thursday Night Football against the Denver Broncos. Moore finished the game against the Broncos going 10-of-19 for 117 yards and a touchdown pass. The following week, Moore started in place of the injured Mahomes against the Green Bay Packers and had 267 passing yards and two touchdowns in the 31–24 loss. In week 9, against the Minnesota Vikings, he had 275 passing yards and a touchdown in the 26–23 victory. Moore's performance against the Vikings was his last significant action of the 2019 season as Mahomes returned from injury in week 10. Moore served as backup quarterback in the Chiefs' first Super Bowl appearance since Super Bowl IV in 1970, clinching the win against the San Francisco 49ers with a score of 31–20 in Super Bowl LIV.

2020 season
Moore re-signed with the Chiefs on July 10, 2020. He was released on September 5, 2020. He was signed to the practice squad the following day. He was elevated to the active roster on January 2, 2021, for the team's week 17 game against the Los Angeles Chargers, and reverted to the practice squad after the game. He was elevated again on February 6 for Super Bowl LV against the Tampa Bay Buccaneers, and reverted to the practice squad after the game. His practice squad contract with the team expired after the season on February 7, 2021.

NFL career statistics

Regular season 

|-
! style="text-align:center;"| 2007
! style="text-align:center;"| CAR
| 9 || 3 || 2–1 || 63 || 111 || 56.8 || 730 || 6.6 || 81.1 || 3 || 5 || 67.0 || 6 || 3 || 5 || 1.7 || 0.6 || 0 || 2
|-
! style="text-align:center;"| 2008
! style="text-align:center;"| CAR
| 0 || 0 || — || colspan="16"| did not play due to injury
|-
! style="text-align:center;"| 2009
! style="text-align:center;"| CAR
| 7 || 5 || 4–1 || 85 || 138 || 61.6 || 1,053 || 7.6 || 150.4 || 8 || 2 || 98.5 || 9 || 12 || −3 || −0.3 || −0.4 || 0 || 2
|-
! style="text-align:center;"| 2010
! style="text-align:center;"| CAR
| 6 || 5 || 1–4 || 79 || 143 || 55.2 || 857 || 6.0 || 142.8 || 5 || 10 || 55.6 || 13 || 5 || 25 || 5.0 || 4.2 || 0 || 4
|-
! style="text-align:center;"| 2011
! style="text-align:center;"| MIA
| 13 || 12 || 6–6 || 210 || 347 || 60.5 || 2,497 || 7.2 || 192.1 || 16 || 9 || 87.1 || 36 || 32 || 65 || 2.0 || 5.0 || 2 || 14
|-
! style="text-align:center;"| 2012
! style="text-align:center;"| MIA
| 2 || 0 || — || 11 || 19 || 57.9 || 131 || 6.9 || 65.5 || 1 || 0 || 96.6 || 2 || 5 || −3 || −0.6 || −1.5 || 0 || 0
|-
! style="text-align:center;"| 2013
! style="text-align:center;"| MIA
| 1 || 0 || — || 2 || 6 || 33.3 || 53 || 8.8 || 53.0 || 0 || 2 || 27.1 || 0 || 0 || 0 || 0.0 || 0.0 || 0 || 0
|-
! style="text-align:center;"| 2014
! style="text-align:center;"| MIA
| 2 || 0 || — || 2 || 4 || 50.0 || 21 || 5.3 || 10.5 || 0 || 0 || 65.6 || 0 || 2 || −2 || −1.0 || −1.0 || 0 || 0
|-
! style="text-align:center;"| 2015
! style="text-align:center;"| MIA
| 1 || 0 || — || 1 || 1 || 100.0 || 14 || 14.0 || 14.0 || 0 || 0 || 118.8 || 0 || 3 || −2 || −0.7 || −2.0 || 0 || 0
|-
! style="text-align:center;"| 2016
! style="text-align:center;"| MIA
| 4 || 3 || 2–1 || 55 || 87 || 63.2 || 721 || 8.3 || 180.3 || 8 || 3 || 105.6 || 1 || 1 || −1 || −1.0 || −0.3 || 0 || 1
|-
! style="text-align:center;"| 2017
! style="text-align:center;"| MIA
| 4 || 2 || 0–2 || 78 || 127 || 61.4 || 861 || 6.8 || 215.3 || 4 || 5 || 75.6 || 12 || 3 || 9 || 3.0 || 2.3 || 0 || 0
|-
! style="text-align:center;"| 2019
! style="text-align:center;" style="background:#afe6ba; width:3em;"|KC
| 4 || 2 || 1–1 || 59 || 91 || 64.8 || 659 || 7.2 || 164.8 || 4 || 0 || 100.9 || 8 || 3 || 1 || 0.3 || 0.3 || 0 || 2
|-
! style="text-align:center;"| 2020
! style="text-align:center;"| KC
| 0 || 0 || — || colspan="16"| 
|- class="sortbottom"
! style="text-align:center;" colspan="2"| Career || 53 || 32 || 16–16 || 645 || 1,074 || 60.1 || 7,597 || 7.1 || 143.3 || 49 || 36 || 82.8 || 87 || 69 || 94 || 1.4 || 1.8 || 2 || 26
|}

Postseason 

|-
! style="text-align:center;"| 2016
! style="text-align:center;"| MIA
| 1 || 1 || 0–1 || 29 || 36 || 80.6 || 289 || 8.0 || 289.0 || 1 || 1 || 97.8 || 5 || 1 || 2 || 2.0 || 2.0 || 0 || 2
|- class="sortbottom"
! style="text-align:center;" colspan="2"| Career || 1 || 1 || 0–1 || 29 || 36 || 80.6 || 289 || 8.0 || 289.0 || 1 || 1 || 97.8 || 5 || 1 || 2 || 2.0 || 2.0 || 0 || 2
|}

References

External links

 Oregon State Beavers bio
 Official website

1984 births
American football quarterbacks
Carolina Panthers players
Dallas Cowboys players
Living people
Miami Dolphins players
Oregon State Beavers football players
Players of American football from California
Sportspeople from Santa Clarita, California
UCLA Bruins football players
People from Van Nuys, Los Angeles
Kansas City Chiefs players